James "Osie" Johnson (January 11, 1923, in Washington, D.C. – February 10, 1966, in New York City) was a jazz drummer, arranger and singer.

Johnson studied at Armstrong Highschool where he was classmates with Leo Parker and Frank Wess. He first worked with Sabby Lewis and then, after service in the United States Navy, freelanced for a time in Chicago. From 1951 to 1953, he was a member of Earl Hines's band.

He can be heard on albums by Paul Gonsalves, Zoot Sims, and Mose Allison and is the drummer on Bobby Darin's "Mack the Knife". (Some sources list Don Lamond as the drummer on "Mack the Knife") and on Ray Conniff's first album 'S Wonderful!. He recorded the album A Bit of the Blues as a singer and had arranged at a "hit" for singer Dinah Washington. His final recordings as a singer were on a J. J. Johnson album, now compiled as a collection called Goodies.

In 1957, Johnson appeared with Thelonious Monk and Ahmed Abdul-Malik on The Sound of Jazz.

Johnson died from kidney failure in 1966, at the age of 43.

Discography

As leader
1955: Johnson's Whacks
1955: Osie's Oasis with Henry Coker, Charlie Fowlkes, Milt Hinton, Bill Hughes, Thad Jones, Dick Katz, Wendell Marshall, Frank Wess, Ernie Wilkins
1955: Swingin' Sounds
1957: The Happy Jazz of Osie Johnson (Bethlehem)

As sideman 
With Bob Brookmeyer
 Brookmeyer (Vik, 1956)
 Jazz Concerto Grosso with Gerry Mulligan and Phil Sunkel  (ABC-Paramount, 1957)
 The Street Swingers with Jim Hall and Jimmy Raney (World Pacific, 1957)
 Kansas City Revisited (United Artists, 1958)

With Jimmy Cleveland 
 Introducing Jimmy Cleveland and His All Stars (EmArcy, 1955)
 Rhythm Crazy (EmArcy, 1959 [1964])

With Al Cohn
 Mr. Music (RCA Victor, 1955)
 The Natural Seven (RCA Victor, 1955)
 That Old Feeling (RCA Victor, 1955)
 Four Brass One Tenor (RCA Victor, 1955)
 From A to...Z (RCA Victor, 1956) with Zoot Sims
 The Sax Section (Epic, 1956)
 Cohn on the Saxophone (Dawn, 1956)

With Coleman Hawkins
 Accent on Tenor Sax (Urania, 1955)
 The Hawk in Hi Fi (RCA Victor, 1956)
 The Hawk in Paris (Vik, 1956)
 Soul (Prestige, 1958)
 Hawk Eyes (Prestige, 1959)
 Coleman Hawkins All Stars with Joe Thomas and Vic Dickenson (Swingville, 1960)
 At Ease with Coleman Hawkins (Moodsville, 1960)
 Coleman Hawkins and His Orchestra (Crown, 1960)
 The Hawk Swings (Crown, 1960)

With Johnny Hodges
 Sandy's Gone (Verve, 1963)
 Blue Rabbit (Verve, 1964)
 Con-Soul & Sax with Wild Bill Davis (RCA Victor, 1965)

With Hank Jones
 The Talented Touch (Capitol, 1958)
 This Is Ragtime Now! (ABC-Paramount, 1964)

With Quincy Jones
 The Birth of a Band! (Mercury, 1959)
 Quincy Jones Explores the Music of Henry Mancini (Mercury, 1964)

With Howard McGhee
 Life Is Just a Bowl of Cherries (Bethlehem, 1956)
 Music from the Connection (Felsted, 1960)

With Joe Newman 
 New Sounds in Swing with Billy Byers (Jazztone, 1956)
 I Feel Like a Newman (Storyville, 1956)
 The Midgets (Vik, 1956)
 Locking Horns (Rama, 1957) with Zoot Sims

With Oscar Pettiford
 Basically Duke (Bethlehem, 1954)
 Another One (Bethlehem, 1955)
 The Oscar Pettiford Orchestra in Hi-Fi (ABC-Paramount, 1956)

With Jimmy Raney
 Jimmy Raney featuring Bob Brookmeyer (ABC-Paramount, 1956) with Bob Brookmeyer
 Two Jims and Zoot (Mainstream, 1964) with Jim Hall and Zoot Sims

With Ben Webster
 Music with Feeling (Norgran, 1955)
 See You at the Fair (Impulse!, 1964)

With others
 Manny Albam, The Drum Suite (RCA Victor, 1956) with Ernie Wilkins
 Mose Allison, I Don't Worry About a Thing (Atlantic, 1962)
 Clifford Brown, The Beginning and the End (Columbia, 1973)
 Ray Bryant, Ray Bryant Trio (Epic, 1956)
 Kenny Burrell, Bluesin' Around (Columbia, 1961 [1983])
 Ralph Burns and Leonard Feather, Winter Sequence (MGM, 1954)
 Arnett Cobb, Smooth Sailing (Prestige, 1959)
 Freddy Cole, Waiter, Ask the Man to Play the Blues (Dot, 1964)
 Art Farmer, Last Night When We Were Young (ABC-Paramount, 1957)
 Aretha Franklin, Aretha: With The Ray Bryant Combo (Columbia, 1961)
 Curtis Fuller, Cabin in the Sky (Impulse!, 1962)
 Bennie Green, Bennie Green Blows His Horn (Prestige, 1955)
 Freddie Green, Mr. Rhythm (RCA Victor, 1955)
 Urbie Green, All About Urbie Green and His Big Band (ABC-Paramount, 1956)
 Tiny Grimes, Callin' the Blues with J. C. Higginbotham (Prestige, 1958)
 Gigi Gryce, Gigi Gryce (MetroJazz, 1958)
 Lionel Hampton, You Better Know It!!! (Impulse!, 1965)
 Johnny Hartman, The Voice That Is! (Impulse!, 1964)
 Claude Hopkins, Yes Indeed! with Buddy Tate and Emmett Berry (Swingville, 1960)
 Lena Horne, Lena on the Blue Side (RCA Victor, 1962)
 Langston Hughes, Weary Blues (MGM, 1958)
 Illinois Jacquet, The Kid and the Brute with Ben Webster (Clef, 1955)
 Budd Johnson, French Cookin' (Argo, 1963)
 J. J. Johnson, Goodies (RCA, 1965)
 Mundell Lowe, Porgy & Bess (RCA Camden, 1958)
 Junior Mance, The Soul of Hollywood (Jazzland, 1962)
 Gary McFarland, The Jazz Version of "How to Succeed in Business without Really Trying" (Verve, 1962)
 Carmen McRae, Carmen McRae (Bethlehem, 1954)
 Helen Merrill, The Artistry of Helen Merrill (Mainstream, 1965)
 Joe Mooney, Lush Life (Atlantic, 1958)
 Phineas Newborn, Jr., Phineas Newborn, Jr. Plays Harold Arlen's Music from Jamaica (RCA Victor, 1957)
 Bud Powell, Blues for Bud (Columbia, 1958)
 Irene Reid, Room for One More (Verve, 1965)
 George Russell, The Jazz Workshop (RCA Victor, 1957)
 Pee Wee Russell, Swingin' with Pee Wee with Buck Clayton (Swingville, 1960)
 A. K. Salim, Stable Mates (Savoy, 1957)
 Shirley Scott, Great Scott!! (Impulse!, 1964)
 Zoot Sims, Zoot! (Riverside, 1956)
 Hal Singer, Blue Stompin' (Prestige, 1959) with Charlie Shavers
 Sonny Stitt, Broadway Soul (Colpix, 1965)
 Sylvia Syms, Sylvia Is! (Prestige, 1965)
 Buddy Tate, Tate's Date (Swingville, 1960)
 Billy Taylor, Kwamina (Mercury, 1961)
 Frank Wess, Southern Comfort (Prestige, 1962)
 Joe Wilder, The Pretty Sound (Columbia, 1959)
 Cootie Williams, Cootie Williams in Hi-Fi (RCA Victor, 1958)
 Kai Winding, Dance to the City Beat (Columbia, 1959)
 Phil Woods, Rights of Swing (Candid, 1961)

References

External links
Worlds Records

1923 births
1966 deaths
Swing drummers
Bebop drummers
American jazz drummers
Singers from Washington, D.C.
American music arrangers
American session musicians
Deaths from kidney failure
20th-century American drummers
American male drummers
20th-century American singers
20th-century American male musicians
American male jazz musicians
United States Navy sailors